Vriesea schwackeana is a plant species in the genus Vriesea. This species is endemic to Brazil.

Cultivars
 Vriesea 'Derek's Dilemma'
 Vriesea 'Fire Dance'
 Vriesea 'Forever Amber'
 Vriesea 'Golden Dawn'
 Vriesea 'Karamea Bronze Queen'
 Vriesea 'Lucky 13'
 Vriesea 'Maroon Dream'
 Vriesea 'Peace Maker'
 Vriesea 'Peach Perfection'
 Vriesea 'Plantation Pride'
 Vriesea 'Red Rocket'
 Vriesea 'Southern Belle'
 Vriesea 'Tango'
 Vriesea 'Touch of Gold'
 Vriesea 'Vista Charm'
 Vriesea 'War Bonnet'
 Vriesea 'Yellow Rebel'
 × Vrieslandsia 'Gigant Flame'

References

BSI Cultivar Registry Retrieved 11 October 2009

schwackeana
Flora of Brazil